Wish I May is a 2016 Philippine television drama romance series broadcast by GMA Network. It premiered on the network's Afternoon Prime line up and worldwide on GMA Pinoy TV from January 18, 2016 to May 20, 2016, replacing The Half Sisters.

Mega Manila ratings are provided by AGB Nielsen Philippines.

Series overview

Episodes

January 2016

February 2016

March 2016

April 2016

May 2016

References

Lists of Philippine drama television series episodes